Official relations between Poland and the United States on a diplomatic level were initiated in 1919 after Poland had established itself as a republic after 123 years of being under foreign rule from the Partitions of Poland. However, ties with the United States date back to the 17th century, when the Polish–Lithuanian Commonwealth was one of Europe's largest powers, and many Poles immigrated to the Thirteen Colonies. During the American Revolutionary War, the Polish military commanders Tadeusz Kościuszko and Casimir Pułaski contributed greatly to the Patriot cause, with Kościuszko becoming a national hero in America. Since 1989, Polish–American relations have been strong and Poland is one of the chief European allies of the United States, being part of both NATO and the European Union. There is a strong cultural appreciation between the two nations (Polonophilia). According to the US Department of State, Poland remains a "stalwart ally" and "one of strongest Continental partners in fostering security and prosperity, throughout Europe and the world." Poland was also one of four participating countries in the American-led Iraq War coalition in 2003.

In addition to close historical ties, Poland is one of the most consistently pro-American nations in Europe and the world, with 79% of Poles viewing the US favorably in 2002 and 67% in 2013. According to the 2012 US Global Leadership Report, 36% of Poles approve of American leadership, with 30% disapproving and 34% uncertain, and in a 2013 BBC World Service Poll, 55% of Poles view US influence positively, the highest rating for any surveyed European country.

Before 20th century

The partitions of Poland erased Poland from the map in 1795 and long prevented the establishment of official diplomatic relations between Poland and the new United States. However, Poland, which enacted the world's second-oldest constitution in 1791, always considered the United States a positive influence. Even in the 18th century, important Polish figures such as Tadeusz Kościuszko and Casimir Pulaski became closely involved with shaping US history. Haym Salomon, a Polish Jew, was the prime financier of the American side during the American Revolutionary War against Great Britain. Many Poles also emigrated to the United States in the 19th century and formed a large Polish American community in urban centres such as Chicago.

American response to November Uprising

Poland's November Uprising in 1831 and the fight for regaining independence from the neighbouring empires were extensively documented and editorialized in American newspapers. As the historian Jerzy Jan Lerski described, "one could reproduce in detail virtually the whole story of the November Uprising from the 1831 files of American dailies published at that time, regardless of the fact that they were usually four-sheet affairs with little space left for foreign news." There were very few Poles in the United States at the time, but views of Poland were shaped positively by its support for the American Revolution. Several young men offered their military services to fight for Poland, the most well-known of which was Edgar Allan Poe, who wrote a letter to his commanding officer March 10, 1831 to join the Polish Army if it was created in France.

Support for Poland was highest in the South, as Casimir Pulaski's death in Savannah, Georgia, was well-remembered and memorialized. An American surgeon, Dr. Paul Fitzsimmons, from the Georgia, actually joined the Polish Army in 1831. He was then in France and, inspired by "how gallant Pulaski had fallen at the siege of Savannah during the Revolutionary struggle of 1776," traveled to Warsaw as a field surgeon for the Polish infantry.

The United States never initiated the creation of a military force for supporting Poland. Financial support and gifts were sent from the United States to the American-Polish Committee in France, which intended to purchase supplies and transport aid to Poland. The American writer James Fenimore Cooper wrote an appeal for the organization at the height of his popularity and motivated a nationwide collection for Poland in American cities. The
Frenchman General Lafayette was an outspoken voice in France and urged for a French intervention to aid Poland in its independence from Russia. The French government sought to make peace with the Russian Empire and generally stayed out of the conflict.

Following the collapse of the insurrection, American newspapers continued to publish news from British and French sources documenting oppression of Poles by the Russian and German Empires. Newspaper editors made mention of the Russians as "brutal" and "evil," and the Poles were "gallant" and "heroic" in their efforts. The American public was apprised of the ongoing suppression of the Polish Catholic Church and the conscription of Poles into the Imperial Russian Army, which hurt Russian-American relations. An American writer in Boston, Robin Carver, wrote a children's book in 1831, Stories of Poland, which said that for Polish children, "Their houses are not peaceful and happy homes, but are open to the spies and soldiers of a cruel and revengeful government.... There is no confidence, no repose, no hope for them, and will not be, till, by some more fortunate struggle, they shall drive the Russians from their borders, and become an independent people." Poetic tributes to Poland were written in America, and literature denouncing the Russian treatment towards Poland continued after the Uprising. Russian Emperor Nicholas I and his emissaries asked the US Secretary of State for a formal rebuke of American newspapers reporting the mistreatment of Poles. US Secretary of State Edward Livingston chose to wait two months before responding to Russia's demands, but the US ambassador to Russia, James Buchanan, made promises to the Russians that the American press would circulate evidence that Russian cruelty had been "much overplayed." The historian Jerzy Jan Lerski was critical of Buchanan's pro-Russian stance on the Polish issue and said that he made statements on Poland without visiting the country or "listening to Polish testimony."

Lincoln and Civil War
Poland's independence lost favour among American intellectuals during the American Civil War. Historians have argued that US President Abraham Lincoln was sympathetic to the Poles but chose not to intervene in Europe's affairs out of fear that European powers would support the Confederate States. The historian Tom Delahaye pointed to 1863 as a critical breakdown in relations between the "Crimean Coalition" (Britain, France, and Austria) and Russia, with Poland's independence a key reason for conflict. Russian sympathies were solidly in favor of the North, and Lincoln expressed a non-interventionist policy towards Russia's "Polish problem." By doing so, Lincoln alienated himself from the British and the French politics and came closer to Russia, which contributed to a balance of power in favor of the tsar.

Second Polish Republic

On 8 January 1918, US President Woodrow Wilson issued his war aims, the Fourteen Points. Point 13 called for independent Poland with access to the sea: "An independent Polish state should be erected which should include the territories inhabited by indisputably Polish populations, which should be assured a free and secure access to the sea, and whose political and economic independence and territorial integrity should be guaranteed by international covenant." On January 22, 1919, US Secretary of State Robert Lansing notified Polish Prime Minister and Secretary for Foreign Affairs, Ignacy Jan Paderewski that the US had recognized the Provisional Polish Government.

At the Paris peace conference between January–June 1919, point 13 with its reference to Poland having "free and secure access to the sea" was the source of much dispute. At the peace conference, Wilson stated what he meant by point 13 was the German city of Danzig (modern Gdańsk, Poland) should go to Poland. Danzig was a deep water port located where the Vistula river flows into the Baltic sea, making the city the principle point where both imports and exports went into and out of Poland. The Polish delegation at the Paris peace conference led by Roman Dmowski argued that allowing Danzig to remain with Germany would give the Reich economic control of Poland and that for Poland to be truly independent required that Danzig go to Poland. Alongside Wilson, the French Premier Georges Clemenceau supported the Polish claim to Danzig, but the British prime minister David Lloyd George was opposed, arguing that because the population of Danzig was about 90% German that ceding the city to Poland would violate the right to national self-determination. In a compromise that pleased no-one, under the terms of the Treaty of Versailles, Danzig was severed from Germany to become the Free City of Danzig, a city-state in which Poland had certain special rights. Wilson argued that he maintained his promise made in point 13 to give Poland "free and secure access to the sea" while respected the wishes of the German population of Danzig not to be forced into Poland by accepting the compromise of the Free City of Danzig.

The United States established diplomatic relations with the newly-formed Polish Republic in April 1919 but the relations between the two countries were distant though positive because of United States non-interventionism and Poland being seen as unimportant for US interests.

Eventually, both countries were part of the Allies during World War II, but there was relatively little need for detailed coordination between the US and the Polish government-in-exile, which was based in London.

Communist Poland

On July 5, 1945, the US government recognized the communist government installed in Warsaw, thus abandoning the Polish government-in-exile. After 1950, Poland, which became the Polish People's Republic since 1952, became a member of the Eastern Bloc and opposed America during the Cold War. The first US ambassador to postwar Poland, Arthur Bliss Lane, wrote a book I Saw Poland Betrayed about how the Western Allies had abandoned their former ally, Poland, to Soviet influence. However, the Polish people and government maintained very close and warm ties with the Western Bloc and the United States.

In September 1946, the American secretary of state James F. Byrnes gave a speech in Stuttgart where in an attempt to appeal to German opinion stated that the Oder–Neisse line was only temporary and that some of the areas recently annexed to Poland might be returned to Germany at a late date. Through Byrnes did not in fact call for Germany to regain its lost lands east of the Oder-Neisse line, the implication of the Stuttgart speech that it might caused much anger in Poland. Byrnes's speech was described as having a "devastating" impact on those Poles who looked towards the United States as an ally.

After Gomułka's arrival to power in 1956, relations with the United States improved considerably. In 1957, the Eisenhower administration as part of a gambit to force the European members of NATO to spend more on defense (a chronic American complaint) suggested in public that the United States would provide West Germany with nuclear weapons if the other NATO did not increase their defense spending. In Warsaw, the American suggestion caused much fear as it was believed that a nuclear-armed West Germany would inevitably use its nuclear weapons to take back the lands east of the Oder-Neisse line. To end this possibility, the Polish Foreign Minister Adam Rapacki devised the Rapacki plan under which Poland, Czechoslovakia, East Germany and West Germany would all be a nuclear weapons free zone alongside a ban on missiles capable of firing nuclear weapons. From the Polish viewpoint, the Rapacki plan had the additional benefit of keeping Soviet nuclear weapons and missiles out of Poland, which would thus end the possibility of American nuclear strikes to destroy them, which in turn would limit the amount of nuclear fall-out on Poland in the event of World War Three. In a speech at the United Nations General Assembly in New York on 2 October 1957, Rapacki formally presented his plan, which he argued would protect the peace of Europe. The plan was rejected by the United States under the grounds that it would weaken NATO by keeping nuclear weapons out of West Germany, through in private Eisenhower thought there was merit to Rapacki's desire to prevent German reunification.

During the Vietnam war, Poland was one of the three powers along with Canada and India that formed the International Control Commission (ICC) that supervised the Geneva Accords, and as such Polish diplomats were often involved in plans to end the Vietnam war. The Polish delegation to the ICC were allowed to tour both Vietnams and were in contact with the leaders in both Hanoi and Saigon, making them ideal intermediaries. When Rapacki visited New Delhi in January 1963, the American ambassador to India, John Kenneth Galbraith met with him to declare his "despair" about the Kennedy administration's policies in  Vietnam and asked for his good offers to have Poland as an ICC member assist with finding a diplomatic solution to the Vietnam war. Galbratih remained in regular contact with Przemysław Ogrodziński, the Polish ambassador to India, in seeking a diplomatic solution to the war. Latre in 1963, the Polish Commissioner to the ICC, Mieczysław Maneli, was involved in the so-called "Maneli affair", a plan to end the Vietnam war by creating a federation of the two Vietnams. In 1966, the Polish diplomat Janusz Lewandowski who served as the Polish commissioner to the ICC played a key role in Operation Marigold, an attempt to broker an end to the Vietnam war. Lewandowski met in Saigon with Henry Cabot Lodge Jr., the American ambassador to South Vietnam, to present a plan for a "bombing pause" of North Vietnam as way to begin peace talks.

In the 1960s, Gomułka's unwillingness to break with the Soviet Union and the negative attitude toward Israel during the Six-Day War caused those relations to stagnate. Polish-American relations improved once more after Edward Gierek had succeeded Gomułka. A consular agreement was signed under in 1972. In 1974, Gierek was the first Polish communist head of state to visit the United States. That action, among others, demonstrated that both sides wished to facilitate better relations.

The birth of Solidarity in 1980 raised the hope that progress would be made in Poland's external relations as well as in its domestic development. The United States provided $765 million in agricultural assistance and loans. Human rights and individual freedom issues, however, were not improved, and the US revoked Poland's most-favored-nation (MFN) status in response to the decision to ban on the Solidarity movement in 1981 and to instigate martial law by the communist Polish United Workers' Party. MFN status was reinstated in 1987.
 
The Reagan administration engaged in clandestine support for Solidarity, and CIA money was channeled through third parties. CIA officers were barred from meeting Solidarity leaders, and their contacts with Solidarnosc activists were weaker than those of the AFL–CIO, which raised $300,000 from its members to provide material and cash directly to Solidarity. The US Congress authorized the National Endowment for Democracy to promote democracy, and it allocated $10 million to Solidarity. CIA support for Solidarity besides money included equipment and training, which was co-ordinated by the Special Operations division of the CIA. Henry Hyde, a member of the US House Intelligence Committee, stated that the US provided "supplies and technical assistance in terms of clandestine newspapers, broadcasting, propaganda, money, organizational help and advice." Michael Reisman from Yale Law School named operations in Poland as one of the covert actions of CIA during Cold War. Initial funds for covert actions by the CIA were $2 million, but soon, authorizations were increased, and by 1985, the CIA had successfully infiltrated Poland.

When the Polish government launched a crackdown of its own in December 1981, however, Solidarity was not alerted. Potential explanations for that vary; some believe that the CIA was caught off guard, but others suggest that American policymakers viewed an internal crackdown as preferable to an "inevitable Soviet intervention."

Third Polish Republic

The United States and Poland have enjoyed warm bilateral relations since 1989. Every post-1989 Polish government has been a strong supporter of continued American military and economic presence in Europe, and Poland is one of the most stable allies of the United States.

When Poland joined NATO on March 12, 1999 the two countries became part of the same military alliance. As well as supporting the Global War on Terror, Operation Enduring Freedom in Afghanistan, and coalition efforts in Iraq (where the Polish contingent was one of the largest), Poland co-operates closely with the United States on such issues as democratization, nuclear proliferation, human rights, regional co-operation in Central and Eastern Europe, and reform of the United Nations.

On 11 September 2001, 6 Polish citizens perished at the World Trade Center in New York City during the September 11 attacks. The monument for Polish 9/11 victims at Skaryszew Park in Warsaw was unveiled by Polish President Aleksander Kwaśniewski on 11 September 2002, the 1st anniversary of the attacks.

In 2004, the Polish diplomat Piotr Ogrodziński stated: "This is a country that thinks seriously about its security. There's no doubt that for such a country, it's good to be a close ally of the United States". In 2004, Ogrodziński spoke to the American media his concerns over what he felt was a lack of American gratitude for Poland's contribution to the Iraq war while denying Poles visa free travel to the United States, saying: "It's very hard to explain why one Polish kid is risking his life in Iraq and another kid is being stopped at the U.S. border because he happened to land in the wrong city".

US President Barack Obama visited Poland on 27–28 May 2011 and met with Polish Prime Minister Donald Tusk and President Bronisław Komorowski. The American and Polish leaders discussed economic, military and technology cooperation issues.

In July 2017, Donald Trump in his second foreign travel visited Poland. He met with Polish President Andrzej Duda. Both then held a joint press conference in the Royal Castle, Warsaw. Trump thanked the Polish people and Duda for the warm welcome that he had received in Warsaw: "Our strong alliance with Poland and NATO remains critical to deterring conflict and ensuring that war between great powers never again ravages Europe, and that the world will be a safer and better place. America is committed to maintaining peace and security in Central and Eastern Europe."

President Trump also spoke with European leaders attending the Three Seas Initiative Summit in Warsaw."

In 2018, Poland proposed for the United States open a permanent military base within its country. The Polish government would finance around $2 billion of the cost of hosting American forces, if the proposal was accepted by the United States. Poland has proposed Bydgoszcz or Toruń as potential base locations. Since 1999, Poland has sought closer military ties with the United States. In an apparent attempt to win favor, it was suggested by President Andrzej Duda in 2018 that the proposed American military base in Poland be named "Fort Trump", a choice of name that provoked controversy with many Poles charging that Duda was trying too hard to flatter Trump. Opinion within the Pentagon was divided about the merits of permanently stationing  an U.S. Army armored division in Poland as the Polish government wanted. Some U.S. Army generals charged that it would strain U.S. Army resources too far and that the proposed location of "Fort Trump" was too exposed to Russian rockets. Other generals argued that having an armored division stationed in Poland was preferable to the current system of rotation as it would allow the troops to get to know the country better. In June 2019, both sides agreed to send 1,000 US troops to Poland. In September 2019, six locations were determined to host approximately 4,500 from the US military in Poland, including: Poznań, Drawsko Pomorskie, Strachowice, Łask, Powidz and Lubliniec.

On 24 June 2020, Trump said at a press conference with Duda that the United States plans to move some US troops from Germany to Poland. Trump said, "Poland is one of the few countries that are fulfilling their obligations under NATO — in particular, their monetary obligations — and they asked us if we would send some additional troops....  I think [putting more US troops in Poland] sends a very strong signal to Russia."

Duda was very close to Trump, which led to strained ties in 2021 under the new administration of Joe Biden. In addition, the perception that the conservative PiS government was undermining the rule of law and its hostility towards gay rights made for difficult American-Polish relations. Liberal American opinion tends to be supportive of gay rights and the practice of several Polish regional governments declaring themselves to be "LGBT-free zones" has led to criticism in the United States. Joe Biden in a 2020 statement declared that the "LGBT-free zones" in Poland “have no place in the European Union or anywhere in the world." In an implicit criticism of the PiS government, on 30 June 2021 the American embassy in Warsaw released a Polish language internet video supportive of gay rights, a move that was condemned by some Poles as interference in Poland's internal affairs. The American charge d'affaires at the Warsaw embassy, Bix Aliu, stated that the video was about anti-gay comments being made on social media.

The Russian aggression against Ukraine with the invasion launched on 24 February 2022 led to the Biden administration doing an U-turn on Poland, which was now embraced as a close ally. Alina Polyakova, president of the Washington-based Center for European Policy Analysis stated in March 2022: "Given the situation, the administration is clearly prioritizing defense and security in the relationship. Poland is the indispensable ally for European security. Other issues and concerns have just taken a back seat. When push comes to shove, and there is a direct military threat to NATO, we need Poland. It doesn’t mean that all is forgiven, but it makes it very clear where the priorities are.” Biden visited Warsaw in March 2022 in a show of support for a frontline NATO state.

Issues

Radosław Sikorski

Despite their apparently close relationship, Wprost (a Polish magazine) obtained a recording of Polish Foreign Minister Radosław Sikorski calling the Polish-American alliance "downright harmful" and causing a "false sense of security." while in a poll made in 2016, around 20% of questioned considered Americans a potential threat to Polish national security. Despite that, also in this poll, more than 50% of questioned considered Americans and Canadians as trustworthy.

US missile defense complex in Poland
 
The US missile defense complex in Poland was part of the Ballistic Missile Defense European Capability of the US, to be placed in Redzikowo, Słupsk, Poland, forming a Ground-Based Midcourse Defense system in conjunction with a US narrow-beam midcourse tracking and discrimination radar system in the Brdy, Czech Republic. The plan was cancelled in 2009.

Polish society was divided on the issue. According to a poll by SMG/KRC released by TVP 50 per cent of respondents rejected the deployment of the shield on Polish soil, while 36 per cent supported it.

In October 2009, with a trip by Vice President Joe Biden to Warsaw, a new, smaller interceptor project on roughly the same schedule as the Bush administration plan, was introduced, and welcomed by Prime Minister Donald Tusk.

"Polish death camps"
In May 2012, during Medal of Freedom Ceremony, US President Obama referred to the concentration camps run by Nazis in Poland during World War II as "Polish death camps," a term that Polish Prime Minister Donald Tusk said showed "ignorance, lack of knowledge and ill will." Calling them "Polish death camps", Tusk said, implied that Poland was responsible and that "there had been no Nazis, no German responsibility, no Hitler." After a White House spokesman issued a regret of misstatement by clarifying that the President was referring to the Nazi death camps, Tusk expressed an expectation of "a reaction more inclined to eliminate once and for all these kinds of errors."

"2021 Polish Media Law"
Lex TVN is a controversial 2021 Polish media law  which modifies the Polish Broadcasting Act. It forbids companies except those from the European Economic Area from holding more than a 49% stake in Polish radio and television stations.

The ruling Law and Justice party argues that it will protect Polish broadcasters from takeovers by companies based in hostile foreign powers such as China and Russia. However, opposition, as well as representatives from European Union and the United States criticized it as it will force American company Discovery to divest itself from Polish biggest television network, TVN, which has been often critical of the PiS-led government; Polish opposition and some international observers expressed fear that the law is threatening press freedom in Poland. The law has been criticized for "threatening the largest ever US investment in Poland".

Images

High-level mutual visits

Resident diplomatic missions 
 Poland has an embassy in Washington, D.C. and consulates-general in Chicago, Houston, Los Angeles and New York.
 United States has an embassy in Warsaw, a consulate-general in Kraków, and a consular agency in Poznań.

See also

 List of ambassadors of the United States to Poland
 Polish Americans
 List of Polish-Americans
 Polish-American vote
 Polish American Historical Association
 Polish American Congress
 Casimir Pulaski Day
 US-EU relations

References

 Janusz Reiter, The Visa Barrier, Washington Post, August 29, 2007

Further reading

 Biskupski, M.B.B. The United States and the Rebirth of Poland, 1914-1918 (2012)
 Biskupski, M.B.B. "Poland in American Foreign Policy, 1918-1945: "Sentimental" or "Strategic" Friendship?: A Review Article," Polish American Studies (1981) 38#2 pp. 5-15 in JSTOR
 Blejwas, Stanislaus A. "Puritans and Poles: The New England Literary Image of the Polish Peasant Immigrant." Polish American Studies (1985): 46–88. in JSTOR
 Cienciala, Anna M. "The United States and Poland in World War II." The Polish Review (2009): 173–194. 
  Daoudi, M.S. and M. S. Dajani, "Poland: The Politactics of Sanctions." The Polish Review (1985): 149-166  online.
 Feis, Herbert. Churchill Roosevelt Stalin The War They Waged and the Peace They Sought A Diplomatic History of World War II  (1957) ch 2, 7, 21, 29, 39–40, 54, 60; very detailed coverage
.

 Jaroszyźska-Kirchmann, Anna D. The Exile Mission: The Polish Political Diaspora and Political America, 1939–1956 (Ohio University Press, 2004).
 Jones, J. Sydney. "Polish Americans." Gale Encyclopedia of Multicultural America, edited by Thomas Riggs, (3rd ed., vol. 3, Gale, 2014), pp. 477–492. online
 Jones, Seth G.  A Covert Action: Reagan, the CIA, and the Cold War Struggle in Poland (WW Norton, 2018).
 Kantorosinski, Zbigniew. Emblem of Good Will: a Polish Declaration of Admiration and Friendship for the United States of America. Washington, DC: Library of Congress (1997)
 Lipoński, Wojciech. "Anti-American Propaganda in Poland From 1948 to 1954: A Story of An Ideological Failure." American Studies International (1990): 80–92. in JSTOR

 McGinley, Theresa Kurk. "Embattled Polonia, Polish-Americans and World War II." East European Quarterly (2003) 37#3 pp 325–344.
 Manijak, William. "Polish American Pressure Groups, Woodrow Wilson and the Thirteenth Point: The Significance of Polish Food Relief, the Polish Vote in the 1916 Presidential Election, and European Events in the Eventual Self-Determination for Poland" (PhD dissertation, Ball State University; ProQuest Dissertations Publishing, 1975. 7616969).
 Mastny, Vojtech. "The Soviet Non-invasion of Poland in 1980-1981 and the End of the Cold War." Europe-Asia Studies 1999 51(2): 189-211. online
 Michalski, Artur. Poland’s Relations with the United States, Yearbook of Polish Foreign Policy (01/2005), CEEOL - Obsolete Link
 Pacy, James S. "Polish Ambassadors and Ministers in Rome, Tokyo, and Washington, DC 1920-1945: Part II." The Polish Review (1985): 381–395.
 Halina Parafianowicz, Herbert C. Hoover and Poland: 1919–1933. Between Myth and Reality. in: Great Power Policies Towards Central Europe, 1914–1945. Bristol: e-International Relations, 2019: pp. 176–198. 1945 online free
 Pease, Neal. Poland, the United States, and the Stabilization of Europe, 1919-1933 (1986)  excerpts
 Pienkos, Donald E. "Of Patriots and Presidents: America's Polish Diaspora and U.S. Foreign Policy Since 1917," Polish American Studies (2011) 68#1 pp. 5–17 in JSTOR

 Sjursen, Helene. The United States, Western Europe and the Polish Crisis: International Relations in the Second Cold War (Palgrave Macmillan, 2003)

 Wandycz, Piotr S. The United States and Poland (1980)

External links
 History of Poland - U.S. relations
Kosciuszko Foundation Online Programs "A REALLY BIG BIRTHDAY CARD'' Recovering a Polish and American Treasure

 
United States
Poland